Tsing Yi Estate is a public housing estate in Tsing Yi Island, New Territories, Hong Kong near Fung Shue Wo Sports Centre and Tsing Yi Park. It is the only public housing estate on Tsing Yi Island which name does not start with the character Cheung (長). This is due to the fact that the estate was named in the memory of Tsing Yi Town (青衣墟), a traditional market town which was demolished in the 1980s to make way for new town developments. Since the estate was situated at the seaside of old Tsing Yi Town, part of it is built on reclaimed land. The estate consists of four residential blocks completed in 1986 and 1989 respectively.

Houses

Demographics
According to the 2016 by-census, Tsing Yi Estate had a population of 8,783. The median age was 46.7 and the majority of residents (98.1 per cent) were of Chinese ethnicity. The average household size was 2.8 people. The median monthly household income of all households (i.e. including both economically active and inactive households) was HK$28,490.

Politics
Tsing Yi Estate is located in Tsing Yi Estate constituency of the Kwai Tsing District Council. It was formerly represented by Wong Pit-man, who was elected in the 2019 elections until July 2021.

See also

Public housing estates on Tsing Yi Island

References

Public housing estates in Hong Kong
Tenants Purchase Scheme